Rhymes & Reasons is the first commercial studio album by the American singer-songwriter John Denver, released in October 1969 by RCA Records. It was reissued on CD by Legacy Recordings in 2005.

"Leaving on a Jet Plane" was written and recorded by Denver in 1966 and included on his debut demo recording John Denver Sings as "Babe I Hate to Go". He made several copies and gave them out as presents for Christmas of that year. Denver's then producer Milt Okun convinced him to change the title and was it renamed "Leaving on a Jet Plane" in 1967. After the success of the Peter, Paul and Mary version in 1969, Denver recorded the song again for his debut album, Rhymes & Reasons, and it was released as a single in October 1969. Although it is one of Denver's best known songs, his single failed to enter the charts. It was  re-recorded for the third and final time in 1973 for John Denver's Greatest Hits and this version appears on most of his compilation albums.

Track listing

Personnel

Musicians
John Denver – guitar, vocals, arranger
Stan Free – organ
Paul Griffin – keyboards
Herbie Lovelle – drums
George Marge – baritone saxophone
Paul Prestopino – guitar, autoharp, mandolin
Albert Richmond – French horn
Russ Savakus – bass guitar
Teddy Sommer – drums
Marvin Stamm – flute, trumpet
Eric Weissberg – banjo, steel guitar
Tommy Goodman - additional instrumentation

Production
Jim Crotty – recording engineer
Milton Okun – producer, arranger
John Woram – recording engineer
Jean Goldhirsch - assistant producer

Charts

References

John Denver albums
1969 debut albums
Albums produced by Milt Okun
RCA Records albums